

This is a list of the National Register of Historic Places listings in Weakley County, Tennessee.

This is intended to be a complete list of the properties and districts on the National Register of Historic Places in Weakley County, Tennessee, United States. Latitude and longitude coordinates are provided for many National Register properties and districts; these locations may be seen together in a map.

There are 11 properties and districts listed on the National Register in the county. Another site was once listed but has been removed.

Current listings

|}

Former listings

|}

See also

 List of National Historic Landmarks in Tennessee
 National Register of Historic Places listings in Tennessee

References

Weakley
 
Buildings and structures in Weakley County, Tennessee